The Keller House and Derick, on E. 1st, North in Paris, Idaho, was listed on the National Register of Historic Places in 1982.

The  cabin is a square Southern Mountain-style cabin, likely built of logs, covered with shiplap siding.  It has a tall gable roof with two gabled dormer windows, and it has a  ell at the rear.  It is one of 18 small square cabins known in Paris, which are otherwise rare in Idaho.

Nearby in a field east of the house is "a fine example" of what is called a Mormon derrick which is:a device of folk technology used until recently throughout the Great Basin to stack loose hay into tall round-topped stacks. The Keller derrick is the
Mormon derrick type, distinguished by its quatrepodal base supporting an upright mast, at the top of which pivots a boom. The base is built of three six-by-six timbers, cut on a circular saw, laid over two similar sills and notched with straight-sided saddle notches at the intersections of sill and crosspiece. These joints are fixed with heavy nuts and bolts. Smaller four-by-four timbers form a quatrepod upon this base, securing the heavy central log mast. Balanced at the top of the mast is a log boom, fastened with a pin that allows horizontal and vertical movement. Pulleys, used to control the hoisting and dumping of hay, are attached to the middle and upper end of the boom. A cable stretched along the top of the derrick and over metal and wooden braces probably acts as a brace for the entire boom.

References

National Register of Historic Places in Bear Lake County, Idaho
Houses completed in 1880